The John Deere DB120 is an agricultural planter made by Bauer Built Mfg. in Paton, Iowa. Upon its release in 2009, it was the largest production planter in the world. This means that in a 12-hour day it will plant almost two sections of land. John Deere claims that the planter is 30% more productive than their 36 row DB90 planter. To transport such an incredibly wide implement, the DB120 folds into five sections . The planter weighs in at over 20 tons empty and almost 24 tons when loaded with seed. The DB120 had a limited release in 2009 with orders being taken for the 2010 season. It retailed at (US)$345,000 dollars. In 2020, the base price on the John Deere website was over $500,000.

The DB120 needs a GPS (satellite navigation) system to guide it as there are no row markers to indicate where to position the tractor/planter.

References

External links
 
 

Tractors
John Deere vehicles